Edward Baynard (c. 1512–1575) was an English politician.

He was a Member (MP) of the Parliament of England for Chippenham.

References

16th-century English MPs
People from Chippenham
1512 births
1575 deaths